William Jackson III (born October 27, 1992) is an American football cornerback who is a free agent. He played college football for the Houston Cougars and was drafted by the Cincinnati Bengals in the first round of the 2016 NFL Draft. Jackson has also played for the Washington Football Team / Commanders and the Pittsburgh Steelers.

High school career
Jackson was born on October 27, 1992, and grew up in the Fifth Ward area of Houston, Texas, alongside a brother and three sisters. He attended and played football at Wheatley High School in the city, where he was teammates with fellow NFL cornerback Xavien Howard. Jackson was considered a three-star prospect by Rivals.com. He accepted a scholarship to play college football at the University of Houston.

College career
Jackson attended Trinity Valley Community College for his freshman year before transferring to the University of Houston for his sophomore year. As a senior in 2015, he broke up 23 passes and had five interceptions.

Statistics

Professional career
With a deep cornerback class going into the combine, many analysts were more focused on Vernon Hargreaves III, Jalen Ramsey, and Mackensie Alexander, regarding them as the top players at their position and had Jackson as a second round selection. Jackson attended the NFL Combine but was unable to finish all the drills at the combine after suffering cramps. On March 31, 2016, Jackson attended Houston's Pro Day. He was projected to be an early round pick in the draft at the conclusion of the pre-draft.

Cincinnati Bengals

2016
The Cincinnati Bengals selected Jackson in the first round (24th overall) of the 2016 NFL Draft. On June 10, 2016, Jackson signed his four-year, $9.07 million rookie contract with the team. Throughout training camp, Jackson competed to be the Bengals' third cornerback on the depth chart against Darqueze Dennard. During camp Jackson had suffered a torn pectoral muscle and would have to undergo surgery, leading him to miss his entire rookie season after he was placed on injured reserve prior to Week 1.

2017
Returning fully healthy in 2017, he made his debut in the season-opener against the Baltimore Ravens and made two solo tackles and a pass deflection in a loss. In Week 3 against the Green Bay Packers, Jackson recorded four solo tackles, a pass deflection, and returned an interception off a pass by quarterback Aaron Rodgers for a 75-yard touchdown. With the interception, he became just the second player in NFL history to return one thrown by Rodgers for a touchdown. In Week 7, Jackson earned his first career start after Adam Jones was inactive due to a back injury. In Week 10, he recorded two solo tackles and made his first career sack during a 24–20 loss at the Tennessee Titans. He was inactive for the Bengals' Week 11 victory at the Denver Broncos due to a toe injury. Jackson became a starting cornerback again for the Bengals' in Week 14 after Jones was placed on injured reserve due to a groin injury. In Week 15, he collected a season-high five combined tackles during a 34–7 loss at the Minnesota Vikings. Jackson finished the 2017 season with 27 tackles, 14 pass deflections, a sack, an interception, and a touchdown.

2018
Throughout training camp, Jackson competed against Darqueze Dennard to be a starting cornerback. Head coach Marvin Lewis named Jackson and Dre Kirkpatrick the starting cornerbacks to begin the regular season.

2019

In April 2019, the Bengals picked up the fifth-year option on Jackson's contract. In Week 2 against the San Francisco 49ers, Jackson recorded his first interception of the season off Jimmy Garoppolo in the 41-17 loss. He was placed on injured reserve  due to a shoulder injury in December 2019. He finished the season with 37 tackles, three passes defensed, and an interception.

2020
Jackson recorded an interception off a pass thrown by Baker Mayfield in Week 2 against the Cleveland Browns.

Washington Football Team / Commanders

2021
Jackson signed a three-year, $40.5 million contract with the Washington Commanders (still known as the Washington Football Team at the time) on March 19, 2021. He recorded his first interception with Washington in the season opener against Los Angeles Chargers quarterback Justin Herbert. In the Week 10 win over the Tampa Bay Buccaneers, Jackson recorded his second interception of the season off a pass thrown by Tom Brady after safety Kamren Curl popped the ball loose from Buccaneers receiver Jaelon Darden. Jackson missed the final two games of the 2021 season due to a calf injury then being placed on the COVID-19 reserve list on January 5, 2022.

2022
In Week 5 of the 2022 season, Jackson was benched in the first quarter against the Tennessee Titans. Jackson stated he left the game due to a bulging disc in his back, but head coach Ron Rivera stated "We just decided to make a change" when asked by media to confirm Jackson's claim. Jackson was reported to request a trade from the team on October 13, 2022. The Commanders made Jackson inactive for the next three games.

Pittsburgh Steelers
On November 1, 2022, Jackson was traded to the Pittsburgh Steelers along with a conditional 2025 seventh-round pick for a conditional 2025 sixth-round pick. He was placed on injured reserve on November 12. The Steelers released Jackson on March 10, 2023.

NFL career statistics

References

External links

Pittsburgh Steelers bio
Houston Cougars bio

Living people
1992 births
Players of American football from Houston
American football cornerbacks
Trinity Valley Cardinals football players
Houston Cougars football players
Cincinnati Bengals players
Washington Commanders players
Washington Football Team players
Pittsburgh Steelers players
African-American players of American football
21st-century African-American sportspeople